Lloyd Eliot Warren (November 10, 1868 - October 25, 1922) was the founder of the Beaux-Arts Institute of Design in New York City

Biography
He was born in Paris, France to George Henry Warren I (November 8, 1823 - April 8, 1892) and Mary Caroline Phoenix (February 27, 1832 - January 18, 1901). His brothers were Whitney Warren (of Warren & Wetmore, one of the most prestigious American architecture firms) and George Henry Warren II, a stockbroker.

Lloyd E. Warren died on October 25, 1922 when he fell out an open window while sleepwalking in his apartment.

The Lloyd Warren Fellowship award was founded to continue his legacy.

References

1868 births
1922 deaths
Accidental deaths from falls
19th-century American architects
20th-century American architects